Mohammad Zaki (born 1979) is an Afghan footballer. He has played for the Afghanistan national team.

National team statistics

External links

1980 births
Living people
Afghan footballers
Footballers at the 2002 Asian Games
Association football forwards
Asian Games competitors for Afghanistan
Afghanistan international footballers